Amarendra Dhari Singh is an Indian politician and entrepreneur. He was elected to the Rajya Sabha the upper house of Indian Parliament from Bihar as a member of the Rashtriya Janata Dal. He has a business in the real estate and chemical sector. He supports underprivileged in education.

References

Living people
Rashtriya Janata Dal politicians
Rajya Sabha members from Bihar
Year of birth missing (living people)